Vorderman is a surname of Dutch origin. 

 Adolphe Vorderman (1844–1902), Dutch physician who contributed to the discovery of vitamins
 Carol Vorderman (born 1960), Welsh television personality